Nickelodeon is a Danish television channel targeting children. It replaces Nickelodeon Scandinavia, which was offered in Denmark between 1996 and 2007.

History
The channel was launched on 15 March 2008 with the launch of VH1 Denmark, where it was broadcast between 6:00 am and 12:00 pm. From 1996 to 2008, Denmark had been served by the pan-Nordic Nickelodeon Scandinavia. The Pan-Nordic channel continues to be available on satellite. VH1 stopped simulcasting Nickelodeon around New Year's Eve 2008/2009, which meant that the two channels had their own frequencies in analogue cable networks such as YouSee and Telia Stofa, where Nickelodeon would now be available between 6:00 am and 6:00 pm.

On 1 September 2009 the channel started broadcasting between 5:00 am and 7:00 pm The channel has been available on the digital terrestrial Boxer TV platform since November 2009. Nickelodeon was one of the least watched children's channels in Denmark in 2008, with a viewing share of 0.3 percent among 3-11 year olds. It was surpassed by Disney Channel (15.7 percent share), Cartoon Network (12.0), Toon Disney (2.2), Jetix (2.1) and Playhouse Disney (2.1), with only Boomerang and Nickelodeon's satellite version having a smaller share of the children channels in Denmark.

References

External links
 Official website

Denmark
Television stations in Denmark
Television channels and stations established in 2008
Television stations in Greenland
2008 establishments in Denmark